James Preston Cook (October 2, 1921 – November 29, 1983) was a stock car racer who competed in the NASCAR Grand National Series and NASCAR Pacific Coast Late Model (PCLM) Series. Born in Illinois, Cook lived in Boston before relocating west across the United States to Norwalk, California.

Biography
Cook began racing in Boston. He moved to the Western United States in the early 1940s. He had a successful short track racing career in Southern California, primarily driving for owner Floyd Johnson. Cook made 39 starts in the Nextel Cup series from 1954 through 1970. Most of Cook's starts were in West Coast races during the time the races counted for both Nextel Cup and PCLM points, though he did compete in the inaugural World 600 at Charlotte Motor Speedway and in the 1964 Daytona 500 and Richmond 250. After this foray, his Nextel Cup series starts were limited to an annual start in the Motor Trend 500, then held each January at Riverside International Raceway. He did compete regularly in the PCLM series, primarily driving for owners Floyd Johnson or Cos Cancilla, finishing in the top ten in points eight times between 1956 and 1969, with a best points finish of 3rd on three occasions (1963, 1967 and 1968). He had five career victories in the PCLM series, the last one coming at Tri-Cities Speedway in West Richland, Washington in July 1969.

Cook scored one career win in the Nextel Cup series at the old California State Fairgrounds in Sacramento, California on September 11, 1960. The 100 mile race took place on the 1 mile dirt oval. Cook, driving Floyd Johnson's Dodge, edged Scotty Cain's T-Bird.

Cook's racing career came to an end when he was severely injured in a crash during the 1970 Motor Trend 500 at Riverside International Raceway on January 18, 1970. His Ford crashed into the end of the turn 9 wall and he suffered head trauma and many broken bones.

After his accident left him using a wheelchair full-time and with large medical and hospital bills, benefit races were held for him at Southern California tracks.

Cook was murdered on November 29, 1983, by a drifter who broke into his Oceanside, California apartment and beat him to death with one of his racing trophies.

In 2006, Jim Cook was inducted into the West Coast Stock Car Hall of Fame.

References

External links
 
 

1921 births
1983 deaths
Male murder victims
NASCAR drivers
People murdered in California
Racing drivers from California
Racing drivers from Illinois
Racing drivers from Massachusetts
Sportspeople from Boston
People from Norwalk, California
Deaths by beating in the United States